"Everything Needs Love" is a 2002 Mondo Grosso single featuring BoA as vocalist.

Track listing
 "Everything Needs Love feat. BoA" - 6:39
 "Everything Needs Love feat. BoA (Piano-pella)" - 6:45
 "Everything Needs Dub feat. BoA" - 7:23
 "Everything Needs Love feat. BoA (Instrumental)" - 6:38

2002 songs
BoA songs
Songs written by Shinichi Osawa